Wilton is an unincorporated community in Wilton Township, Waseca County, Minnesota, United States, near Waseca.  The community is located near the junction of Waseca County Roads 4 and 23.  The Le Sueur River flows through the community.

History
Wilton was platted in 1855. A post office was established at Wilton in 1856, and remained in operation until 1881. Wilton served as county seat from 1857 until 1870.

References  

Unincorporated communities in Waseca County, Minnesota
Unincorporated communities in Minnesota
1855 establishments in Minnesota Territory
Populated places established in 1855